Carmelo Daniel Villalba is a former Argentine football defender. He played in the final of the 1985 Copa Libertadores for Argentinos Juniors.

Villalba was signed by Argentinos Juniors from El Porvenir, he played for the club during its golden age, when they won 2 league titles, the Copa Libertadores 1985 and the Copa Interamericana as well as playing in the final of the Copa Intercontinental against Juventus of Italy.

After playing for Argentinos Villalba joined Unión de Santa Fe in 1989 where he played until 1990. He then played in the lower leagues of Argentine football for Galaxia de Puerto Iguazu, Chacarita Juniors, Club Atlético Tigre and CSD Tristán Suárez.

After retiring as a player Villalba became a coach, working in the youth development system at Argentinos Juniors.

Titles

References

Argentine footballers
Association football defenders
Argentinos Juniors footballers
Argentine Primera División players
Unión de Santa Fe footballers
Chacarita Juniors footballers
Club Atlético Tigre footballers
Footballers from Buenos Aires
Living people
Place of birth missing (living people)
1962 births